Robert Russell (1933 in Hempstead, NY - March 29, 2020 in Madison, WI) was an American composer, educator, and broadcaster.

Biography
He received bachelor's and master's degrees in composition from the Manhattan School of Music. After graduation, he served on the faculty of the City University of New York. He then became a classical music broadcaster on WNYC, hosting the "world" classical music program Hands Across The Sea upon the retirement of WNYC's original music director Herman Neuman.

In 1977 he joined the staff of Wisconsin Public Radio and remained there until his retirement in 1995. He hosted and produced several classical music programs, including Morning Concert, Tonight At 8, and Sunday Afternoon Live from the Elvehjem.

In 1983 he married Barbara Boehm.

His compositions were performed worldwide, including premieres at Carnegie Hall and Lincoln Center. Some of his music was published by Paul Kapp's General Music Publication Company; some published scores and manuscripts have been archived by NYPL's American Music Center. His suite Places for piano 4-hands, which contains extra-musical inspiration and allusions to several New York City locations, has been kept alive in the repertoire by Jean and Kenneth Wentworth, Weekley & Arganbright and Rodewald & Morebello. His Abstract No. 2, has been kept alive in the brass repertoire through Wuff Ridd's arrangement for trumpet ensemble.

Selected compositions 

 End of May, a "music drama", excerpts of which were performed at Carnegie Recital Hall on April 13, 1965 by Bradley Alexander and Jennie Kallas.
 So How Does Your Garden Grow? (1965), one-act opera buffa, libretto by Russell. Premiered March 18, 1966 in Carnegie Hall.
 Places, op. 9, suite for piano 4-hands, dedicated to his niece Helen Clark, premiered Feb 24th at Carnegie Recital Hall by Jean and Kenneth Wentworth
 Abstract No. 1, op. 14 for two clarinets and dancer
 Metamorphoses, op. 19 for clarinet alone
 Sonatinas, op. 23 for trumpet and piano
 Sonata in one movement for trombone (or horn) and piano, op. 24 (1967)
 Pan, op. 26 for flute and piano
 Scherzo, for clarinet and piano
 Abstract No. 2 for two trumpets or horns. Arranged for trumpet ensemble by Wuff Ridd.
 Duo for flute and piano
 Brass quintet
 Woodwind Quintet op. 32
 A Spring Sampler
 Symphony for Six: A Percussion Sextet (1971) premiered at Carnegie Hall as part of WNYC's 33rd Annual American Music Festival.
 Dover Beach, song for voice and piano
 Manhattan from my window, song for voice and piano

References 

1933 births
2020 deaths
20th-century American composers
People from Hempstead (town), New York